Anthologion, or Anthologue, is a breviary that has been in use among the Greeks.

The Anthologion contains the daily divine offices addressed to Jesus Christ, the Virgin Mary, and the principal saints. Other common offices include those of prophets, apostles, martyrs, pontiffs, and confessors, according to the Greek rite.

It is called , .

See also 
 Anthology
 Florilegium

References 

Christian genres
Christian liturgical texts